The legislation of Bosnia and Herzegovina recognises three constituent peoples and 17 national minorities (nacionalne manjine). These latter include 2.73% of the total population of the country, i.e. 96,539 persons. The biggest community is the Romani people in Bosnia and Herzegovina, which are estimated at around 58,000 persons.

Legislative framework 

The state-level  Law on the Protection of National Minorities in Bosnia and Herzegovina was adopted in 2003, followed by the Law on the Protection of National Minorities of the Republika Srpska in 2005, and the Law on the Protection of National Minorities in Federation of BiH in 2008. Similar laws were passed also by the Government of the Brcko District of BiH and three cantons of the Federation of BiH. In June 2020 the Brcko District adopted a new Law on the rights of National Minorities.

Bosnia and Herzegovina ratified the European Charter for Regional or Minority Languages in 2010.

National Minority Councils 

Since 2006, the Parliamentary Assembly of Bosnia and Herzegovina established the Council of National Minorities, as a special advisory body to  give opinions, advice and proposals to the Parliamentary Assembly of BiH on all matters concerning the law, position and interests of national minorities in Bosnia and Herzegovina.
The BiH National Minority Council is composed of 17 representatives of national minorities, one representative on behalf of each ethnic
minority.

The National Minority Council of the Federation of Bosnia and Herzegovina entity was established in March 2016.

The National Minority Council of the Republika Srpska entity was established in 2005.

The National Minority Council of Sarajevo Canton was established in 2012, with extended powers of legislative initiative.

The National Minority Council of the Brcko District was established in May 2022, on the basis of the new district law on national minorities adopted in October 2020

Associations 

In Bosnia and Herzegovina exists more than 100 national minority CSOs. Generally, associations operate individually or within the alliances. The Association of National Minorities of Republika Srpska (ANMRS) was established in 2003 as a voluntary and open non-partisan association of citizens. It gathers, as an umbrella organisations, 40 member associations of national minorities in Republika Srpska.

Education in minority languages 
Italian and Ukrainian are taught in one and four schools respectively in the town of Prnjavor (15 and 24 pupils in total in 2015).

German, Russian, and Italian are taught as foreign languages in several high schools throughout the country.

Associations and embassies also organise several elective courses of minority languages as foreign languages.

Several newsletters and bulletins are published periodically in minority languages, including four in Slovene, and one each in Hungarian (Új dobos), Macedonian (Vinozito), Italian (Stella d'Italia) and Czech (Banjalucki Krajani)

Demographics

See also 
 1991 census
 2013 census
 Demographics of Bosnia and Herzegovina
 Demographic history of Bosnia and Herzegovina

Notes 

 on the short-lived Polish/Ukrainian community of BIH, see Husnija Kamberovic's paper "Iseljavanje Poljaka iz Bosne i Hercegovine 1946. godine."